Eileen M. Decker is an American attorney who served as the U.S. Attorney for the Central District of California from 2015 to 2017. Decker was nominated to join the Los Angeles Board of Police Commissioners in September 2018, where she became the President of the Board of Commissioners.

Decker teaches Comparative Counterterrorism Law and Policy at the UCLA School of Law. 

Decker practiced law at Gibson, Dunn & Crutcher for three years before working as a US Attorney.

Education
B.A. New York University, 1982
J.D. New York University School of Law, 1990
M.A. Naval Postgraduate School, 2014

See also
2017 dismissal of U.S. attorneys

References

California Democrats
Naval Postgraduate School alumni
New York University School of Law alumni
Commissioners of the Los Angeles Police Department
United States Attorneys for the Central District of California
UCLA School of Law faculty
1960 births
Living people
People associated with Gibson Dunn